Tomponsky District (Tompo uluuha) is an administrative and municipal district (raion, or ulus), one of the thirty-four in the Sakha Republic, Russia. It is located in the east of the republic and borders with Momsky District in the northeast, Oymyakonsky District in the east, Ust-Maysky District in the southeast, Tattinsky District in the southwest, Ust-Aldansky and Kobyaysky Districts in the west, and with Verkhoyansky District in the north and northwest. Its administrative center is the urban locality (a settlement) of Khandyga. Population:  15,275 (2002 Census);  The population of Khandyga accounts for 47.1% of the district's total population.

Geography
The landscape of the district is mostly mountainous. Its main rivers include the Aldan, the Tompo, Adycha, Nelgese, Derbeke and the Khandyga. Lake Emanda is located on the Yana Plateau, in the northern part of the district.

Climate

History
The district was established on May 20, 1931.

Demographics
As of the 1989 Census, the ethnic composition was as follows:
Russians: 57.1%
Yakuts: 21.8%
Evens: 3.2%
Evenks: 0.4%
other ethnicities: 17.5%

Economy
The economy of the district is based on mining, production of construction materials, and agriculture. There are deposits of tin, tungsten, copper, lead, zinc, antimony, molybdenum, gold, silver, coal, gypsum, marble, and other minerals.

Inhabited localities

Divisional source:

*Administrative centers are shown in bold

References

Notes

Sources

Districts of the Sakha Republic
States and territories established in 1931
1931 establishments in the Soviet Union